Robert Timothy Stansfield "Bob" Frankford (August 1, 1939 – August 1, 2015) was a politician in Ontario, Canada. He was a New Democratic member of the Legislative Assembly of Ontario from 1990 to 1995 who represented the Toronto riding of Scarborough East.

Background
Frankford was educated at King's College London in England, and became a family physician before entering political life. He was responsible for inaugurating the first health service organization in Toronto. He raised three daughters. He died in Toronto on August 1, 2015 at the age of 76.

Politics
He was elected to the Ontario legislature in the 1990 provincial election, defeating Liberal incumbent Ed Fulton by 1,774 votes in Scarborough East as the NDP won a majority government.  He served as a parliamentary assistant from 1990 to 1991. He used his medical training to advocate for sickle-cell disease and other health issues. He resigned in May 1991 because he failed to meet a deadline to divest himself of some investment property in the health industry.

The NDP were defeated in the 1995 provincial election, and Frankford lost his seat to Progressive Conservative candidate Steve Gilchrist by almost 12,000 votes.

He ran for the federal New Democratic Party for the House of Commons of Canada in the 1997 federal election, but finished a distant fourth against Liberal John McKay in Scarborough East.  He also attempted to return to the provincial legislature in the 1999 provincial election, but finished third against Liberal Gerry Phillips in Scarborough—Agincourt. Frankford's wife, Helen Breslauer, has also run as a candidate in Toronto Centre but finished 4th.

In August 2009, he sought the NDP nomination for the provincial by-election in the riding of St. Paul's, but was defeated by lawyer Julian Heller.

Electoral record

After politics
In 1995 he returned to his medical practice and became a physician at the Seaton House men's hostel, which services many poor and homeless in the city. He was chair of the Ontario Medical Association's section of health service organization physicians.

He remained involved in a number of community projects and organizations, including the Sickle Cell Association of Ontario and the Toronto Pedestrian Committee, and was chair of the Scarborough Agincourt collaborative committee of the Central East LHIN.

References

External links
 

1939 births
2015 deaths
Alumni of King's College London
Ontario New Democratic Party MPPs
Politicians from Toronto